Wiltshire Wyverns is a rugby league based in Corsham, Wiltshire. They play in the Rugby League Conference West of England division.

History
Wiltshire Wyverns was established by Nick Westaway in March 2010 and played three friendly fixtures during the 2010 season. The club was accepted into the newly formed Rugby League Conference West of England division for the 2011 season.

Rugby league teams in Wiltshire
Rugby League Conference teams
Rugby clubs established in 2010
2010 establishments in England